The Monkey Cage is a blog published by The Washington Post since 2013. The blog was created in 2007. The blog was created in part to push back on political media coverage and policy discourse which ignored political science research. The blog's contents have been described as a form of explainer-journalism, as the blog primarily publishes short editorials by academic political scientists who summarize their political science research or apply political science to current events. The blog also occasionally publishes pieces by scholars in related academic disciplines.

In 2011, the blog won "Blog of the Year" by The Week magazine. The blog's content has been cited in numerous newspapers. According to John M. Sides, the blog was visited by 719,000 people and viewed over 2 million times from November 2007 and December 2010.

References 

The Washington Post
Academic works about political science
American political blogs
Internet properties established in 2007
Publications established in 2007